Marguerre is a surname. Notable people with the surname include:

Eleonore Marguerre (born 1978), German opera singer
Wolfgang Marguerre (born 1941), German billionaire